Diana Nemorensis ("Diana of Nemi"), also known as "Diana of the Wood", was an Italic form of the goddess who became Hellenised during the fourth century BC and conflated with Artemis. Her sanctuary was to be found on the northern shore of Lake Nemi beneath the cliffs of the modern city Nemi (Latin nemus Aricinum). This lake is referred to by poets as speculum Dianae – "Diana's Mirror"; by the town of Aricia which was situated about three miles off, at the foot of the Albanus Mons, the Alban Mount, and separated by a steep descent from the lake, which lies in a small crater-like hollow on the mountainside.

Origin of the legend

According to one of several Hellenising foundation myths, the worship of Diana at Nemi would have been instituted by Orestes, who, after killing Thoas, king in the Tauric Chersonesus (the Crimea), fled with his sister Iphigenia to Italy, bringing with him the image of the Tauric Diana hidden in a mound of sticks. After his death, the myth has it, his bones were transported from Aricia to Rome and buried in front of the Temple of Saturn, on the Capitoline slope, beside the Temple of Concord. The bloody ritual which legend ascribed to the Tauric Diana is familiar to classical readers; it was said that every stranger who landed on the shore was sacrificed on her altar, but that, when transported to Italy, the rite of human sacrifice assumed a milder form. 

No historical or archaeological evidence links these Greek myths to the cultus, or religious cult,  at Nemi.

Qualities
The temple of Diana Nemorensis was preceded by the sacred grove in which there stood a carved cult image. The temple was noted by Vitruvius as being archaic and "Etruscan" in its form. A. E. Gordon has observed that "the comparatively late date of the excavated remains of the sanctuary does not preclude the dedication of the grove at the end of the sixth century." Andreas Alföldi has demonstrated that the cult image still stood as late as 43 BC, when it was reflected in coinage.

 
The Italic type of the triform cult image of Diana Nemorensis was reconstructed by Alföldi from a sequence of later Republican period coins he connected with a gens from Aricia. In early examples the three goddesses stand before a sketchily indicated wood, the central goddess placing her right hand on the shoulder of one goddess and her left on the hip of the other. The three are shown to be one by a horizontal bar behind their necks that connects them. Later die-cutters simplified the image. Alföldi interpreted the numismatic image as the Latin Diana "conceived as a threefold unity of  the divine huntress, the Moon goddess, and the goddess of the nether world, Hekate," noting that Diana montium custos nemoremque virgo ("keeper of the mountains and virgin of Nemi") is addressed by Horace as diva triformis ("three-form goddess"). Diana is commonly addressed as Trivia by Virgil and Catullus. 
 
The votive offerings, none earlier than the fourth century BC, found in the grove of Aricia portray her as a huntress, and further as blessing men and women with offspring, and granting expectant mothers an easy delivery. The dedicatory inscription, long disappeared, was copied for its curiosity as testimony to the political union of Latin cities, the Latin league by Cato the Elder and transmitted, perhaps incompletely, by the grammarian Priscianus:
Lucum Dianium in nemore Aricino Egerius Baebius Tusculanus dedicavit dictator Latinus. hi populi communiter: Tusculanus, Aricinus, Lanuvinus, Laurens, Coranus, Tiburtis, Pometinus, Ardeatis Rutulus 

Diana Nemorensis was not translated to Republican Rome by the rite called evocatio, as was performed for Juno of Veii, but remained a foreigner there, in a temple outside the pomerium, apparently on the Aventine.

A votive inscription of the time of Nerva indicates that Vesta, Roman goddess of the hearth, home, and family, was also venerated in the grove at Nemi.

Lake and Grove of Aricia

Sir James George Frazer writes of this sacred grove in the often-quoted opening of The Golden Bough, basing his interpretation on brief remarks in Strabo (5.3.12), Pausanias (2,27.24) and Servius' commentary on the Aeneid (6.136) Legend tells of a tree that stands in the center of the grove and is guarded heavily. No one was to break off its limbs, with the exception of a runaway slave, who was allowed, if he could, to break off one of the boughs. He was then in turn granted the privilege to engage the Rex Nemorensis, the current king and priest of Diana in the region, in one-on-one mortal combat. If the slave prevailed, he became the next king for as long as he could defeat challengers.

By the time Caligula interfered in the succession of priest-kings, the murder-succession had devolved into a gladiatorial combat before an audience.

See also
 Querquetulanae, oak nymphs who may have been associated with Diana Nemorensis

Notes and references

Further reading
 Giulia D'Angelo - Alberto Martín Esquivel, P. Accoleius Lariscolus (RRC 486/1) in Annali dell'Istituto Italiano di Numismatica, 58 (2012), pp. 139-160;
 Carin M.C. Green, Roman Religion and the Cult of Diana at Aricia (Cambridge University Press, 2007), limited preview online , ;
Edith Hall, 2013, Adventures with Iphigenia in Tauris: A Cultural History of Euripides' Black Sea Tragedy (Oxford University Press) ISBN 0195392892;
 Alberto Martín Esquivel - Giulia D'Angelo, Un cuño romano republicano de P. Accoleius Lariscolus in Nvmisma. Revista de estudios numismáticos, 258 (2014), pp. 51-59.

External links
 Blog of exhibition of Nemi material at Nottingham museum 2013
 Nemi at Nottingham project

Roman goddesses
Ancient Roman religion
Diana (mythology)
Epithets of Diana
Lake Nemi